{{DISPLAYTITLE:NG2 (duo)}}

NG2 is a Puerto Rican Salsa duo formed by Norberto Vélez and Gerardo Rivas. Rivas is the son of Jerry Rivas, one of the singers of El Gran Combo. Rivas also enjoyed early fame during his childhood as the lead singer of "Gerardito y los Rockolos".

Both of the members were a part of fellow Puerto Rican Salsa singer Víctor Manuelle orchestra before deciding to go out solo. Víctor Manuelle has supported them all throughout.

The duo has enjoyed much success during their short career, even winning a Latin Billboard in 2005 for Best Tropical Song. Norberto Vélez and Gerardo Rivas, the groups' vocalists performed the single "Mi salsa se respeta" as a message to the other groups in the industry. With it they wanted to express that "while young in this, [industry] we know how to do our work very well". When the group debuted, their success was underestimated by the public and fellow musicians. Both performed also noted that they want the tropical genre to unify their efforts, to gather interest from the public.

Discography 
 Comienzos (2004)
 Al Fin (2006)
 Con Todas Las De Ganar (2008)
 Al Borde De La Locura (2012)

References 

NG2
NG2
Sony Music Latin artists